Glenn Lewis (aka Flakey Rrose Hip [sic]) (born 1935 in Chemainus, British Columbia, Canada) is a Canadian cross-disciplinary contemporary artist.

Life and career
Lewis is a contemporary ceramicist, sculptor, potter, muralist, photographer, videographer, filmmaker, performance artist, and writer, as well as a teacher and administrator.

After receiving a scholarship from the Royal Canadian Legion in Kelowna, British Columbia in 1954, Lewis spent the next ten years studying painting, drawing, and ceramics, and teaching. In 1969, Lewis was commissioned by the Canadian government to create a work of art for Expo '70 in Osaka, Japan. Artifact, a sculptural ceramic work, was ultimately not shown, because it was thought by the commissioner of  the Canadian pavilion to be obscene.

As a co-founding member of the New Era Social Club, Intermedia, and, in 1973, the Western Front, Lewis was one of an internationally recognised group of artists who established social practice as an artistic medium in Vancouver.

In 2017, Lewis was named by the Canada Council for the Arts as one of eight recipients of the Governor General's Awards in Visual and Media Arts, for which he received a $25,000 cash prize.

Lewis lives and works in Roberts Creek, British Columbia.

See also 
 Storm Bay (British Columbia)

Further reading

References

Canadian ceramists
Canadian sculptors
Canadian male sculptors
1935 births
Living people
Canadian muralists
Canadian video artists
Canadian performance artists
21st-century ceramists
Governor General's Award in Visual and Media Arts winners